Opio Toure (March 31, 1954 – February 4, 2008) was an American politician who served in the Oklahoma House of Representatives from the 99th district from 1994 to 2006.

He died of congestive lung failure on February 4, 2008, in Oklahoma City, Oklahoma at age 53.

References

1954 births
2008 deaths
Democratic Party members of the Oklahoma House of Representatives
20th-century American politicians